The Damansara River is a river in Selangor state, Malaysia. It runs from Sungai Buloh until Shah Alam.

Name in other languages
According to multilingual sign near the river, it is written as 
 Sungai Damansara in Malay
 Damansara River in English
 白沙罗河 (Bái shā luó hé) in Chinese
 Sông Đamănxara in Vietnamese
 แม่น้ำดามันสาระ in Thai

See also
 List of rivers of Malaysia

References

Rivers of Selangor
Klang River
Nature sites of Selangor